The 3000 metres race walk is a racewalking event. The event is competed as a track race and was part of the athletics programme for women at the IAAF World Indoor Championships in Athletics until 1993. Athletes must always keep in contact with the ground and the supporting leg must remain straight until the raised leg passes it. 3000 meters is 1.86 miles.

World records
IAAF just ratified world records for women's indoor marks. On January 30, 1999, Claudia Stef of Romania set the 3000 m race walk world indoor record in Bucharest in a time of 11:40.33. The all-time men's best 3000 m race-walk mark was also set indoors and is held by Tom Bosworth of the United Kingdom, at 10:30.28.

All-time top 25
+ = en route to 5000m performance
i = indoor performance
h = hand timing
A = affected by altitude

Men
Correct as of June 2022.

Notes
Below is a list of other times equal or superior to 11:00.68:
Tom Bosworth also walked 10:43.84 (2018), 10:58.21i (2016).
Dane Bird-Smith also walked 10:56.06 (2018).
Christopher Linke also walked 10:58.94 (2022).
Callum Wilkinson also walked 10:59.00 (2019).

Women
Correct as of February 2018.

Notes

Below is a list of other times equal or superior to 11:54.80:
Claudia Stef also walked 11:40.99 (1999), 11:43.72 (1999).
Alina Ivanova also walked 11:49.99 (1992).
Beate Gummelt also walked 11:52.01 (1993), 11:53.03i (1996).
Yelena Nikolayeva also walked hand-timed 11:54.8 (1992).

References

Racewalking distances